Ever since 1970, the Social Democrats had held the mayor's position in Tårnby Municipality. 

Following the 2017 election, Allan Andersen from the Social Democrats, had won his first term as mayor. 

In this election, it would become the fourth election in a row where the Social Democrats won 8 seats, and they would once again become the largest party. They would eventually agree with the Green Left and the Red–Green Alliance, that Allan Andersen should continue for a second term, and this would mark the 14th term in a row with the Social Democrats holding the mayor's position.

Electoral system
For elections to Danish municipalities, a number varying from 9 to 31 are chosen to be elected to the municipal council. The seats are then allocated using the D'Hondt method and a closed list proportional representation.
Tårnby Municipality had 19 seats in 2021

Unlike in Danish General Elections, in elections to municipal councils, electoral alliances are allowed.

Electoral alliances  

Electoral Alliance 1

Electoral Alliance 2

Results

Notes

References 

Tårnby